Following is a list of states by participation in United States presidential elections:

References

See also
List of United States presidential election results by state

Participation